The 2009–10 NCAA football bowl games concluded the 2009 NCAA Division I FBS football season.  It comprised 34 team-competitive bowl games, and three all-star games. The games began play on December 19, 2009 and included the 2010 BCS National Championship Game in Pasadena, California, played on January 7 at the Rose Bowl Stadium.  The post-season concluded with three all-star games: the East–West Shrine Game on January 23,  the Senior Bowl on January 30, and the Texas vs. The Nation Game on February 6.

A total of 34 team-competitive games were played. While bowl games had been the purview of only the very best teams for nearly a century, this was the fourth consecutive year that teams with non-winning seasons participated in bowl games. To fill the 68 available bowl slots, a total of eight teams (12% of all participants) with non-winning seasons participated in bowl games—all eight had a .500 (6-6) season.

Selection of the teams

NCAA by-laws state that a school with a record of 6–6 in regular season play is eligible only if conferences cannot fill out available positions for bowl games with teams possessing seven (or more) wins (excluding games played in Hawaii and conference championship games in the ACC, Big 12, Conference USA, Mid-American Conference and the SEC). An example was in 2008 when the Big Ten, the Big 12 and SEC each had two teams selected for the Bowl Championship Series games – Ohio State and Penn State from the Big Ten, Texas and Oklahoma from the Big 12 and Alabama and Florida from the SEC. With each conference sending two teams to the BCS, these three conferences forfeited several bowl game slots due to a lack of teams with a winning record.

As with the 2006 and 2008 seasons, all eligible teams with at least 7 wins made it in to a bowl game. Of the 71 eligible teams, only 68 could play in a game, and all three eligible teams that sat out bowl season were 6-6: Louisiana-Lafayette, Louisiana-Monroe, and Notre Dame, who opted not to play in a bowl game themselves after the firing of head coach Charlie Weis.

For the first time in BCS history, every participant in a BCS bowl was ranked in the top 10 of the final BCS standings.

Fox ends BCS contract
Fox Sports no longer broadcast the Bowl Championship Series following the conclusion of the Orange Bowl on January 5; the network had carried the first three BCS National Championship stand-alone games. ABC telecast this season's contest because of their separate agreement with the Pasadena Tournament of Roses, the organizers of the Rose Bowl Game and the hosts of the 2010 national championship. Beginning in 2011, ABC sibling company ESPN will begin carrying all of the BCS bowls, in an agreement that will last through 2014. Fox has signed a long-term contract extension with the AT&T Cotton Bowl Classic through 2014, with a new prime-time Friday night date starting in 2011.

Sponsorship and stadium changes
Maaco became the new title sponsor of the Las Vegas Bowl replacing Pioneer Corporation, and the game was rebranded as the Maaco Bowl Las Vegas.  In another change, the Motor City Bowl thanks to Little Caesars now carries the name of the Little Caesars Pizza Bowl.  Advocare became the title sponsor of the Independence Bowl. In a stadium shift, the Cotton Bowl Classic moves from its self-named home for 73 years at the grounds of Fair Park to Jerry Jones's new Cowboys Stadium in Arlington. The St. Petersburg Bowl was initially to be played without a sponsor after being sponsored by MagicJack in 2008, but just a few weeks before the Bowl, Beef O'Brady's agreed to be the sponsor, so the game became the "St. Petersburg Bowl presented by Beef O'Brady's".

New bowls in 2010–11
The Cotton Bowl in Fair Park will be the site of a new bowl game, the TicketCity Bowl, on New Years Day 2011, with the Big Ten and Conference USA providing opponents, and Yankee Stadium will host a game dubbed the Pinstripe Bowl in December 2010, pitting teams from the Big East and Big 12. This contest would be the first bowl game in the Metropolitan New York area since the now defunct Garden State Bowl, and the first in New York City since the now defunct Gotham Bowl was played in the original Yankee Stadium, while a third bowl, called the Cure Bowl benefiting Susan G. Komen for the Cure would pit members of the Sun Belt Conference and C-USA at Bright House Networks Stadium on the campus of the University of Central Florida in Orlando, Florida.  The NCAA Football Issues Committee must approve of these games in the spring of 2010 to make them official.

Coaching changes
As a result of head coaching changes between the regular season and the bowl season, the following teams played their postseason contests with interim head coaches:

In addition, the following coach retired, but worked his team's bowl game:

Notes
 Kelly left Cincinnati to take the same job at Notre Dame.
 Jones left Central Michigan to fill the Cincinnati vacancy.
 Leach was suspended by Texas Tech on December 28 when redshirt sophomore wide receiver Adam James, son of ESPN analyst Craig James, and his family filed a complaint alleging mistreatment by Leach after the younger James had suffered a concussion. Two days later, Leach was fired.
 On December 26, Florida head coach Urban Meyer announced his resignation due to health concerns, effective after the Gators' Sugar Bowl appearance. However, Meyer had a change of heart and announced the following day that he would instead take an indefinite leave of absence, and expected to be back coaching by the start of the 2010 season. Offensive coordinator Steve Addazio took over Meyer's duties during his leave. Meyer returned to his job in time to lead the Gators' 2010 spring practice.

Bowl schedule

All dates and game times for the 34 2009–10 season bowl games were announced on April 30, 2009, and are subject to change. They received licenses from the NCAA Football Issues Committee.
NOTE: Rankings from final BCS Standings of December 6, 2009.

Post-BCS all-star games

Bowl Challenge Cup standings

• – Does not meet minimum game requirement of three teams needed for a conference to be eligible.
† – Bowl Challenge Cup winner.

References